This is a list of notable people from West Bengal, India. This list does not include the significant number of prominent East Bengali refugees from East Bengal who settled in West Bengal after the partition of the Indian sub-continent in 1947.

Literature

Major figures

 Bibhutibhushan Bandyopadhyay
 Manik Bandopadhyay
 Tarasankar Bandyopadhyay
 Rajshekhar Basu
 Shibram Chakraborty
 Amiya Chakravarty
 Bankim Chandra Chattopadhyay
 Sarat Chandra Chattopadhyay
 Pramatha Chaudhuri
 Mahasweta Devi
 Michael Madhusudan Dutt
 Sudhindranath Dutta
 Kazi Nazrul Islam
 Annada Shankar Ray
 Satyajit Ray
 Narayan Sanyal
 Rabindranath Tagore

Children's story writers

 Sasthipada Chattopadhyay
 Shibram Chakraborty
 Upendrakishore Ray Chowdhury
 Narayan Debnath
 Narayan Gangopadhyay
 Sunil Gangopadhyay
 Leela Majumdar
 Samaresh Majumdar
 Premendra Mitra
 Shirshendu Mukhopadhyay
 Moti Nandi
 Satyajit Ray
 Sukumar Ray
 Hemendra Kumar Roy
 Syed Mustafa Siraj

Medieval Bengal literary scene

 Chandidas
 Kashiram Das
 Govindadasa
 Krishnadasa Kaviraja
 Krittibas Ojha
 Bharatchandra Ray
 Vidyapati

Other authors from early modern period

 Akshay Kumar Baral
 Ghulam Mustafa Burdwani
 Romesh Chunder Dutt
 Anil Kumar Gain
 Ishwar Chandra Gupta
 Peary Chand Mitra
 Parijat (writer)
 Indra Bahadur Rai
 Dwijendralal Ray
 Kaliprasanna Singha
 Jyotirindranath Tagore
 Swami Vivekananda

Prominent foreign-language authors from Bengal

 Sri Aurobindo
 Anirban Bhattacharyya
 Upamanyu Chatterjee
 Amit Chaudhuri
 Souhardya De
 Chitra Banerjee Divakaruni
 Toru Dutt
 Kaberi Gayen
 Amitav Ghosh
 Jhumpa Lahiri
 Pritish Nandy

Other authors from early/mid-twentieth century and some contemporary authors

 Ekram Ali
 Jatindramohan Bagchi
 Tarasankar Bandyopadhyay
 Subimal Basak
 Abul Bashar
 Sukanta Bhattacharya
 Nachiketa Chakraborty
 Nirendranath Chakravarty
 Shibram Chakraborty
 Sandipan Chattopadhyay
 Sanjib Chattopadhyay
 Shakti Chattopadhyay
 Malay Roy Choudhury
 Salil Chowdhury
 Alokeranjan Dasgupta
 Buddhadeb Dasgupta
 Mahasweta Devi
 Anil Kumar Gain
 Kaberi Gayen
 Narayan Gangopadhyay
 Joy Goswami
 Prabir Ghosh
 Santosh Kumar Ghosh
 Shankha Ghosh
 Subodh Ghosh
 Buddhadeb Guha
 Baby Halder
 Syed Kawsar Jamal
 Bimal Kar
 Binoy Majumdar
 Samaresh Majumdar
 Arun Mitra
 Bimal Mitra
 Narendranath Mitra
 Bibhutibhushan Mukhopadhyay
 Subhash Mukhopadhyay
 Kumud Ranjan Mullick
 Moti Nandi
 Purnendu Pattrea
 Dilipkumar Roy
 Samir Roychoudhury
 Narayan Sanyal
 Subodh Sarkar
 Jatindranath Sengupta
 Mallika Sengupta
 Shankar

Journalists

 Ekram Ali
 Tamal Bandyopadhyay
 Mrinal Chatterjee
 Ramananda Chatterjee
 Sunanda K. Datta-Ray
 Kaberi Gayen
 Tushar Kanti Ghosh
 Chandan Mitra
 Moti Nandi
 Pritish Nandy
 Sukumar Ray
 Barun Sengupta

Language/linguistics, anthropology, history, and other social sciences 

 Raja Ram Mohan Roy, first Bengali prose writer
 Ishwar Chandra Vidyasagar, creator of Standard Bengali prose (sadhu bhasha)
 Bhudev Mukhopadhyay, earliest educationist
 Anil Kumar Gain, fellow of the Royal Society
 Rajendralal Mitra, first Indian to work with Indologists
 Haraprasad Shastri, historian of Bengali language and culture
 Dinesh Chandra Sen, historian of Bengali literature and folklorist
 Pramatha Chaudhuri, creator of modern Bengali prose (chalit bhasha) along with Tagore
 Sir Jadunath Sarkar, historian
 Rajsekhar Bose, major contributor for scientific terms in Bengali and lexicographer
 Ramesh Chandra Majumdar, historian
 Ramesh Chandra Dutta, historian
 Girindrasekhar Bose, first non-European correspondent of Freud
 Suniti Kumar Chatterjee, linguist
 Harinath De, linguist
 Biraja Sankar Guha, anthropologist
 Sukumar Sen, linguist
 Susobhan Sarkar, historian
 Nirmal Kumar Bose, anthropologist, associate of Gandhi
 Niharranjan Ray, historian
 Dineshchandra Sircar, epigraphist
 Debiprasad Chattopadhyaya, social philosopher
 Surajit Chandra Sinha, anthropologist
 Haricharan Bandopadhayaya, lexicographer
 Tapan Raychaudhuri, professor of history at Oxford University
 Amartya Sen, Nobel Prize awardee in Economics
 Ranajit Guha, subaltern theorist
 Sumit Sarkar, historian
 Kirti Narayan Chaudhuri, historian
Maniklal Sinha, novelist, historian and archaeologist of west Rarh
 Gayatri Spivak, feminist
 Vina Mazumdar, women's studies academic
 Hem Chandra Raychaudhuri, Indian historian

Scholars and polymaths
 Radhakanta Deb, linguist
 Asima Chatterjee, scholar of chemistry
 Anil Kumar Gain, scholar, mathematician
 Ramendra Sundar Tribedi, scientist
 Amlan Datta, economist, Vice Chancellor of Visva Bharati
 Prithwindra Mukherjee, scholar of Indian history, philosophy, religion and culture
 Suniti Kumar Chatterji, linguist

Education

Pioneers

 Girish Chandra Bose
 Anil Kumar Gain
 Ashutosh Mukherjee
 Satish Chandra Mukherjee
 Begum Rokeya
 Ishwar Chandra Vidyasagar

Post-independence
 Sudhi Ranjan Das, Chief Justice of India, Vice-chancellor of Visva Bharati

Others
 Mahesh Chandra Nyayratna Bhattacharyya

Teachers

 Katyayanidas Bhattacharya, philosophy, Presidency College
 Debiprasad Chattopadhyaya, philosophy, University of Calcutta
 Barun De, history, Presidency College
 K. C. Nag, mathematics, Mitra institution
 Susobhan Sarkar, history, Presidency College
 Babar Ali, the world's youngest headmaster, Headmaster & Founder of Ananda Siksha Niketan

Philosophy

Pre-modern period
 Chaitanya Mahaprabhu (Achintya Bhedabheda Vedanta) born in Nabadwip of Nadia district to parents who hailed from Sylhet in present day Bangladesh
 Madhusudana Saraswati (Advaita Vedanta), born in Kotalipara, Gopalganj District in present day Bangladesh & studied at Nabadwip in Nadia district
 Raghunatha Siromani (Navya Nyaya) from Nabadwip

Modern age

 Chandril Bhattacharya, born in Kolkata
 Krishna Chandra Bhattacharya born in Serampore in Howrah district
 Anukulchandra Chakravarty born in Pabna district in present day Bangladesh, worked & preached in Kolkata. After the Partition of India in 1947, he relocated to Deoghar
 Surendranath Dasgupta, born in Kusthia of present day Bangladesh which was then a part of Nadia before Partition of India, studied in Kolkata
 Bimal Krishna Matilal, born in Jaynagar in South 24 Parganas district
 Amartya Sen, born in Shantiniketan in Birbhum District
 Keshab Chandra Sen born in Kolkata
 Rabindranath Tagore born in Kolkata
 Swami Vivekananda born in Kolkata
 Sri Aurobindo

Science

 Sanghamitra Bandyopadhyay, computer scientist
 Somnath Bharadwaj, cosmology
 Santanu Bhattacharya, chemistry
 Manilal Bhaumik
 Satyendra Nath Bose
 Upendranath Brahmachari
 Bidyut Baran Chaudhuri, Computer scientist
 Anil Kumar Gain, mathematics
 Partha Ghose
 Sankar Ghosh
 P.C. Mahalanobis
 Dwijesh Dutta Majumdar, Computer scientist
 Ujjwal Maulik, computer scientist
 Ashesh Prosad Mitra
 Sisir Kumar Mitra
 Subhash Mukhopadhyay, physician
 Sankar Kumar Pal, Computer scientist
 Amal Kumar Raychaudhuri
 Anjali Roy, mycologist
 Subrata Roy, plasma physics
 Ram Brahma Sanyal, zoology
 Amartya Sen, Nobel Laureate, economist, Bank of Sweden Prize in Economic Sciences
 Ashoke Sen, physics
 Radhanath Sikdar

Religious scholars

Muslim
Jalaluddin Tabrizi (13th-century)
Gazi Pir (13th-century)
Pir Gorachand (13th-century)
Usman Serajuddin (1258–1357)
Alaul Haq (1301–1384)
Nur Qutb Alam (d. 1416)
Fakhr ad-Din al-Burdwani (d. 1785)
Ghulam Mustafa Burdwani (fl. 1780s)
Shah Mehr Ali (1808–1868)
Ubaidullah Al Ubaidi Suhrawardy (1832–1885)
Azangachhi Shaheb (1828–1932)
Mohammad Abu Bakr Siddique (1865–1943)
Abdullah al-Baqi (1886–1952)
Abbas Siddiqui (born 1987)

Pre-modern period
 Chaitanya Mahaprabhu
 Nityananda
 Six Goswamis of Vrindavana
 Krishnananda Agamavagisha
 Ramprasad Sen

The Brahmo Samaj
 Debendranath Tagore
 Raja Ram Mohan Roy
 Ram Chandra Vidyabagish
 Keshub Chunder Sen
 Anandamohan Bose

Hindu revival movement
 Ramakrishna
 Sarada Devi
 Swami Vivekananda
 Sri Aurobindo

Mid-twentieth-century religious figures
 A.C. Bhaktivedanta Swami Prabhupada
 Paramahansa Yogananda
 Swami Sri Yukteswar Giri
 Lahiri Mahasaya

Social reformation and social work

Major figures
 Ram Mohan Roy
 Ishwar Chandra Vidyasagar
 Keshab Chandra Sen
 Swami Vivekananda
 Protap Chunder Mozoomdar
 Anil Kumar Gain
 Nibaran Chandra Mukherjee
 Sri Sri Harichand Thakur
 Satish Chandra Mukherjee
 Dwarkanath Ganguly

Derozians
 Ramtanu Lahiri
 Radhanath Sikdar
 Rajnarayan Basu
 Peary Chand Mitra
 Rasik Krishna Mallick
 Krishna Mohan Banerjee
 Madhusudan Dutta
 Hara Chandra Ghosh
 Ramgopal Ghosh
 Kishori Chand Mitra

Women's rights
 Rani Rashmoni
 Kadambini Ganguly
 Chandramukhi Basu
 Kaberi Gain
 Sarala Devi
 Begum Rokeya
 Charulata Mukherjee
 Romola Sinha

Military
 Subhas Chandra Bose, founder, Indian National Army
 General Jayanto Nath Chaudhuri, Indian Army Chief during the Indo-Pakistani War of 1965
 Admiral Adhar Kumar Chatterji, Indian Navy Chief between 1966 and 1970.
 Air Commodore Sudhindra Kumar Majumdar (1927–2011), India's first military helicopter pilot
 Air Marshal Subroto Mukherjee, former Head of Indian Air Force
 Chief of the Air Staff Designate Arup Raha, 24th chief of Indian Air Force.
 Indra Lal Roy, first Indian (pre Independence) flying ace
 General Shankar Roychowdhury, former Indian Army Chief
 Flight Lieutenant Suhas Biswas, recipient of Ashoka Chakra
 Captain Man Bahadur Rai, recipient of Ashoka Chakra
 Air Vice Marshal Madhavendra Banerji, recipient of Maha Vir Chakra

Art

Early modern period
 Abanindranath Tagore
 Gaganendranath Tagore
 Nandalal Bose
 Kalipada Ghoshal
 Mukul Dey
 Jamini Roy
 Ramkinkar Baij
 Binode Bihari Mukherjee
 Sailoz Mookherjea

From mid-twentieth century
 Anil Karanjai
 Bikash Bhattacharjee
 Chintamani Kar
 Ganesh Pyne
 Hemen Majumdar
 Jahar Dasgupta
 Jogen Chowdhury
 Paresh Maity
 Paritosh Sen
 Samir Mondal
 Somenath Hore

Film and photography
 Dulal Dutta
 Subrata Mitra, cinematographer
 Indrani Pal-Chaudhuri,
 Satyajit Roy, filmmaker, screenwriter, author, illustrator, and music composer

Music

Composers

 Abbasuddin Ahmed
 Atulprasad Sen
 Anil Biswas
 Dwijendralal Ray
 Dilipkumar Roy
 Gouri Prasanna Majumdar
 Hemanta Mukherjee
 Kazi Nazrul Islam
 Kamal Dasgupta
 Kabir Suman
 Manabendra Mukhopadhyay
 Nachiketa Ghosh
 Raichand Boral
 Rajanikanta Sen
 Salil Chowdhury
 Sachin Dev Burman
 Sudhin Dasgupta

Performers (instrumental)
 Allauddin Khan,  sarod and multi-instrumentalist
 Ali Akbar Khan, sarod
 Annapurna Devi, surbahar
 Buddhadeb Dasgupta, sarod
 Manilal Nag, sitar
 Nikhil Banerjee, sitar
 Ravi Shankar, sitar
 Radhika Mohan Maitra, Sarod and Mohanveena
 Sankha Chatterjee, tabla
 Shankar Ghosh, tabla
 Pannalal Ghosh, flute
 Jnan Prakash Ghosh, Harmonium and tabla

Performers (vocal)

Classical
 Gopeshwar Banerjee
 Naina Devi
 Ajoy Chakrabarty, vocal
 Bishnupur Gharana
 Tarapada Chakraborty
 Kaushiki Chakraborty

Songs of Tagore and his contemporaries

 Dinendranath Tagore
 Dilipkumar Roy
 Sahana Devi
 Amiya Tagore
 Renuka Dasgupta
 Malati Ghoshal
 Santidev Ghosh
 Debabrata Biswas
 Uma Bose
 Subinoy Roy
 Kanika Bandyopadhyay
 Suchitra Mitra
 Nilima Sen
 Gita Ghatak
 Sarmila Bose
 Indrani Sen

Modern

 K. C. Dey
 Sachin Dev Burman
 Pankaj Kumar Mullick
 Kanan Devi
 Hemanta Mukherjee
 Sandhya Mukhopadhyay
 Amit Kumar
 Abhijeet Bhattacharya
 Bappi Lahiri
 Babul Supriyo
 Geeta Dutt
 Indrani Sen
 R D Burman
 Kishore Kumar
 Kumar Sanu
 Madhushree
 Kabir Suman
 Manna Dey
 Manabendra Mukherjee
 Mohammed Aziz
 Monali Thakur
 Nachiketa Chakraborty
 Ruma Guha Thakurta
 Shaan
 Silajit Majumder
 Shyamal Mitra
 Shreya Ghoshal
 Antara Chowdhury
 Srikanta Acharya
 Anjan Dutt
 Arijit Singh
 Rupam Islam
 Anupam Roy

Nazrul geeti 

Indrani Sen
Purabi Dutta
Manabendra Mukhopadhyay

Movies

Directors

 Aniruddha Roy Chowdhury
 Anjan Dutt
 Anurag Basu
 Aparna Sen
 Basu Bhattacharya
 Basu Chatterjee
 Bimal Roy
 Buddhadeb Dasgupta
 Chidananda Dasgupta
 Debaki Bose
 Goutam Ghose
 Hrishikesh Mukherjee
 Mrinal Sen
 Mujibar Rahaman
 Pritish Chakraborty
 Prem Prakash Modi
 Raj Chakraborty
 Mohammad Mohsin
 Rituparno Ghosh
 Ritwik Ghatak
 Satyajit Ray
 Shiboprosad Mukherjee
 Shoojit Sircar
 Srijit Mukherji
 Sujit Mondal
 Sujoy Ghosh
 Supriyo Sen
 Suman Mukhopadhyay
 Tapan Sinha
 Tarun Majumdar

Actors

 Abhishek Chatterjee
 Abir Chatterjee
 Anil Chatterjee
 Anirban Bhattacharya
 Ankush Hazra
 Apurva Agnihotri
 Arun Mukherjee
 Asit Sen
 Bhanu Bandopadhyay
 Biswajit Chakraborty
 Chhabi Biswas
 Chinmoy Roy
 Chiranjeet Chakraborty
 Dev
 Dhritiman Chatterjee
 Harindranath Chattopadhyay
 Hiran Chatterjee
 Jeet
 Jisshu Sengupta
 Joy Kumar Mukherjee
 Kali Banerjee
 Kamal Mitra
 Keshto Mukherjee
 Lokesh
 Mir Afsar Ali
 Mithun Chakraborty
 Pahari Sanyal
 Parambrata Chatterjee
 Pradeep Kumar
 Pritish Chakraborty
 Priyanshu
 Prosenjit Chatterjee
 Rabi Ghosh
 Rahul Roy
 Ranjit Mallick
 Saswata Chatterjee
 Soumitra Chatterjee
 Subhendu Chatterjee
 Tapas Paul
 Tathagata Mukherjee
 Tulsi Chakraborty
 Utpal Datta
 Uttam Kumar
 Victor Banerjee

Actresses

 Anita Guha
 Aparna Sen
 Arundhati Devi
 Chhaya Devi
 Debashree Roy
 Devika Rani
 Indrani Haldar
 Joya Ahsan
 June Malia
 Kananbala
 Kanan Devi
 Koel Mullick
 Madhabi Mukherjee
 Mala Sinha
 Mamata Shankar
 Mimi Chakraborty
 Nusrat Jahan
 Moon Moon Sen
 Moushmi Chatterji
 Pratyusha Banerjee
 Raakhee
 Rachna Banerjee
 Raima Sen
 Reema Sen
 Rimi Sen
 Rituparna Sengupta
 Riya Sen
 Ruma Guha Thakurta
 Sabitri Chatterjee
 Sharmila Tagore
 Srabanti Chatterjee
 Subhashree Ganguly
 Suchitra Sen
 Sumita Sanyal
 Supriya Devi
 Sushmita Sen
 Varsha Ashwathi

Cinematographer

Avik Mukhopadhyay
Baby Islam
Binod Pradhan
Kamal Bose
Nemai Ghosh (director)
Ramananda Sengupta
Subrata Mitra
Sudeep Chatterjee
Supratim Bhol

Editor

 Dulal Dutta
 Arghyakamal Mitra
 Rabiranjan Maitra
 Mainak Bhaumik
 Srijit Mukherji

Dance
 Uday Shankar
 Amala Shankar
 Mamata Shankar
 Sharmila Biswas

Doctors
 B.C. Roy
 S. K. Burman
 Subhash Mukhopadhyay
 Nilratan Sircar
 Radha Gobinda Kar
 Rafiuddin Ahmed (dentist)
 Upendranath Brahmachari
Sambhu Nath De
Kadambini Ganguly
Tabitha Solomon
Madhusudan Gupta

Drama/theatre

 Girish Chandra Ghosh
 Dinabandhu Mitra
 Jyotirindranath Tagore
 Dwijendralal Ray
 Sisir Bhaduri
 Bijon Bhattacharya
 Shambhu Mitra
 Utpal Dutt
 Bibhas Chakraborty
 Rudraprasad Sengupta
 Badal Sarkar
 Usha Ganguly
 Manoj Mitra
 Ajitesh Bandopadhyay
 Debshankar Halder

Magicians
 Ganapati Chakraborty
 P. C. Sorcar
 P. C. Sorcar Jr.
 P. C. Sorcar, Young
 Maneka Sorcar

Politicians and revolutionaries

Pre-modern
 Shashanka
 Gopala
 Dharmapala
 Devapala
 Mahipala
 Ballal Sen
 Lakshman Sen

Colonial period
 Titumir
 Satyendranath Tagore
 Romesh Chunder Dutt
 Lord Satyendra Prasanna Sinha
 Nripendra Narayan, philanthropist and ruler of Cooch Behar
 Durjan Singh, leader of Chuar rebellion
 Rani Shiromani, queen of Karnagarh and leader of Chuar rebellion
 Gobardhan Dikpati, leader of Chuar rebellion

Indian freedom fighters

Early figures
 Surendranath Banerjee
 Womesh Chandra Bonnerjee

Twentieth century

 Bipin Chandra Pal
 Sri Aurobindo
 Syed Badrudduja
 Barindra Kumar Ghosh
 Khudiram Bose
 Bagha Jatin
 Chittaranjan Das
 Rash Behari Bose
 Sarat Chandra Bose
 Netaji Subhas Chandra Bose
 Jatindra Nath Das
 Bina Das
 Matangini Hazra
 B. C. Roy
 Triguna Sen
 Panchanan Chakraborty
 Syama Prasad Mookerjee
 Basanta Kumar Biswas
 Ambika Chakrobarty
 Bipin Behari Ganguli
 Jogesh Chandra Chattopadhyay
 Narendra Mohan Sen
 Birendranath Sasmal
 Sudhamoy Pramanick
 Saroj Mukherjee
 Renuka Ray
 Shyama Prasad Mukherjee
 Hemchandra Kanungo
 Kanailal Bhattacharyya
 Kanailal Bhattacharjee

Politicians

 Ashok Mitra
 Ajit Kumar Panja
 A. B. A. Ghani Khan Choudhury
 Atulya Ghosh
 Amit Mitra
 Abha Maiti
 Bidhan Chandra Roy
 Bimal Gurung
 Buddhadeb Bhattacharjee
 Bir Singh Mahato
 Babul Supriyo
 Derek O'Brien
 Dev
 Firhad Hakim
 Hashim Abdul Halim
 Jyoti Basu
 Kamal Guha
 Kanailal Bhattacharyya
 Kedarnath Bhattacharya
 Mamata Banerjee
 Mukul Roy
 Mriganko Mahato
 Mohammed Salim
 Narahari Mahato
 Partha Chatterjee
 Pratap Chandra Chunder
 Prafulla Chandra Sen
 Pranab Mukherjee
 Siddhartha Shankar Ray
 Subrata Mukherjee
 Sultan Ahmed (Indian politician)
 Saugata Roy
 Somnath Chatterjee
 Sabina Yeasmin
 Sovandeb Chattopadhyay
 Tathagata Roy
 Tanmoy Bhattacharya

Others
 Abul Barkat

Donation and social welfare

Old Calcutta / Bengal legends
 Raja Nabakrishna Deb
 Raja Radhakanta Deb, published two Sanskrit dictionaries used by Westerners
 Gobindram Mitter
 Anil Kumar Gain
 Mutty Lal Seal
 Bijoy Chand Mahtab
 Uday Chand Mahtab
 Mother Teresa
 Manindra Chandra Nandy, Maharaja of Cossimbazar

Sports

Chess
 Dibyendu Barua, Grandmaster
 Surya Shekhar Ganguly, Grandmaster
 Nisha Mohota, first woman Grandmaster of West Bengal

Cricket
 Arun Lal
 Benu Dasgupta
 Jhulan Goswami
 Pankaj Roy
 Priyanka Roy
 Rumeli Dhar
 Ambar Roy
 Saba Karim
 Sourav Ganguly
 Ashok Dinda
 Manoj Tiwary
 Wriddhiman Saha
 Shreevats Goswami

Football
P. K. Banerjee
Samar Banerjee
Shibdas Bhaduri
Subrata Bhattacharya
Gostho Pal
Krishanu Dey
Sailen Manna
Chuni Goswami
Gautam Sarkar

Lawn tennis
 Leander Paes, noted lawn tennis player of India
 Jaidip Mukerjea

Squash
 Saurav Ghosal, currently highest ranked Indian player
 Ritwik Bhattacharya, currently second highest ranked Indian player

Bodybuilding
 Manohar Aich, Mr. Universe, 1952
  Monotosh Roy, Mr. Universe, 1951
  Bishnu Charan Ghosh, Noted bodybuilder and hathayogi

Swimming
 Arati Saha, first Asian woman to swim English Channel in 1959
 Bula Choudhury, first Indian woman to swim the English Channel twice
 Mihir Sen, first Indian to swim across the English Channel in 1958
 Prasanta Karmakar, para swimmer, 2010 Commonwealth Games, bronze medal
 Masudur Rahman Baidya, world's first physically handicapped swimmer to swim across the Strait of Gibraltar

Table tennis
 Subhajit Saha, Commonwealth games gold medalist
 Mouma Das, table tennis player
 Poulomi Ghatak, table tennis player
 Ankita Das, table tennis player, 2012 Summer Olympics; participant in women's singles event, 2014 Commonwealth Games; participant in women's doubles even
 Soumyajit Ghosh, table tennis player; as of January 2013, his rank is 1st in India and 68th in Asia; 2014 Commonwealth Games, Participant in men's doubles event

Others
 Chhanda Gain, mountaineering, first Bengali woman to climb Mount Everest
 Jyotirmoyee Sikdar, athletics, double gold medallist at Bangkok Asiad, 1996
 Mohammad Ali Qamar, boxing, Commonwealth games gold medalist
 Arjun Atwal, golfer
 Anirban Lahiri, Indian golfer
 Balaram Bose, philanthropist
 Mohammed Ali Qamar, Indian boxer, 2002 Commonwealth Games, gold medal
 Sukhen Dey, Indian weightlifter; 2014 Commonwealth Games, gold medal; 2010 Commonwealth Games, gold medal
 Dipa Karmakar, Indian artistic gymnast; 2014 Commonwealth Games, bronze medal; 2010 Commonwealth Games participant
 Joydeep Karmakar, Indian shooter, 2012 Summer Olympics; qualified to represent India in men's 50m rifle prone event; 2014 Commonwealth Games participant

Industry/business
 Jagat Seth
 Dwarakanath Tagore
 Diptendu Pramanick
 Rajen Mookerjee
 S. K. Burman
 Ghanshyam Das Birla
 Jugal Kishore Birla
 Ram Nath Goenka
 Madhav Prasad Birla
 Rajat Kumar Gupta
 Purnendu Chatterjee
 Sadhan Dutt
 Subir Raha
 Sumantra Ghoshal
 Pritish Chakraborty
 Alamohan Das
 Dilip Shanghvi

Other areas
 Ashis Nandy, author, political psychologist
 Subroto Mukerjee
 Shankar Roychowdhury
 William Tolly
 P. C. Sorcar, Jr., magician from Kolkata
 Arup Raha
 Narayan Debnath

See also
 List of people by India state
 List of Bengalis

References

West Bengal
 
People